Radio broadcasting in Egypt began in the 20th century, in 1924 as privately owned and operated community stations. Later, in 1934 private ownership and operation were abolished and radio broadcasting was nationalized ever since.

By the early 1990s, Egypt had only 4 FM stations in Greater Cairo (2 in Alexandria), but the number increased to 6 in Greater Cairo (4 in Alexandria) by the end of the decade. The increase in the number was merely a rebroadcast of the already AM radio stations. In 2000, AM stations (on the medium wave band) started a phase of simulcasting to FM band, as of 2013, only one or two stations broadcast on AM without FM simulcasts.

All the local radio stations have always been publicly owned, however, state-controlled which make them in practice, stated owned, with the exception of the apolitical private radio station at El Gouna resort, named El Gouna Radio ("Lagoon Radio"). All broadcast media are somehow state controlled, even if partly or fully private.

As of 2002, there were only 8 radio stations broadcast on FM to Greater Cairo (6 in Alexandria), none of them was specialized in popular songs. On March 23, 2002, Voice of America (VOA) had changed its shortwave Arabic service to an appealing station for the youth, named Radio Sawa ("Radio Together"), started broadcasting on a more easily receivable MW signal from Cyprus. For the first time, the state allowed Good News to start a joint venture with the state-controlled ERTU, which started a test broadcasting for two popular song stations to Greater Cairo, as of June 2002. The two were Nogoum FM ("Stars FM"; for popular mainly Egyptian songs) and Nile FM (for popular mainly American songs).

Local stations

All local radio stations in Egypt are also simulcasted on the series of the satellites (partly private but state controlled), Nilesat at 7 degrees west, except El Gouna Radio.

Local stations are typically broadcast on FM. Very few radio stations use the Radio Data System to broadcast the station name, but receiving the RDS is very rare in FM receivers in Egypt. Very few available mobile phones in Egypt which have an FM receiver, receive the RDS information. 90.9 MHz is the only station to broadcast the current song or show title, but when the title is long, it is partly displayed.
All of the radio stations are state-controlled, unless otherwise noted.

Greater Cairo
Greater Cairo region has the most number of FM stations in Egypt. The broadcasting antenna of FM and terrestrial TV is in Mokattam hills, as they are the most elevated location within Greater Cairo, to make the transmission reaches the widest area possible, however, the signals are weakly received farther than 40 kilometers, which makes transmission weak to the most eastern part of New Cairo, the eastern half of Shorouk City, two-thirds of western 6 October City, all of Madinaty, Badr and New Heliopolis.

A few of the following stations are broadcast on other frequencies in other regions in Egypt.

All stations which broadcast popular songs are mainly Egyptian songs with very few Levantine hits (mostly Lebanese) or other north African.

87.8 MHz Mix (since 2019)
88.2 MHz Radio Hits (stereo) – popular songs with occasional foreign songs (mostly American popular hits). (similar to Radio Masr but with more songs) (since mid 2010)
88.7 MHz Radio Masr (stereo; RDS) - popular songs and news briefs. (popular songs & news; similar format to Radio Sawa ) (since mid 2010; as test transmission since 2009)
89.5 MHz Middle East Radio (stereo) – spoken content and songs.
90.9 MHz El Radio FM 90 9 (stereo; RDS) – popular songs. (since April 2012)
91.5 MHz Cultural Program (mono) – spoken content, rarely classical music, some affiliate foreign stations programs.
92.1 MHz NRJ Egypt (stereo) (since 2017)
92.7 MHz Mega FM (stereo)
93.7 MHz On sport FM (since 2019)
95 MHz Shaabi FM (stereo) – traditional and old Egyptian songs.
95.4 MHz European Program (El-Bernamag el-Orobbi) (mono and stereo interchangeably) (English, French, Greek, Italian, German) – spoken content with western hits.
98.2 MHz Al-Qur'aan Al-Kareem Radio (mono) (All Arab League members have a Quran station)
98.8 MHz Musical Program (Al-Moseeka Radio) (stereo) – classical international music, folk and old Egyptian songs, soft music and foreign songs (mostly American popular hits).
100.6 MHz Nogoum FM (stereo; RDS) – popular songs. (joint venture with ERTU)
102.2 MHz Greater Cairo Radio (Al-Qahera Al-Kobra Radio) (stereo) – spoken content.
104.2 MHz Nile FM (stereo; RDS) – Full-time English-speaking. Syndicated American and British shows as well as local talk shows in English. (joint venture with ERTU)
105.3 MHz Nagham FM ("Tunes FM") (stereo) – popular songs (since 2012)
105.8 MHz Specialty Songs (Aghany Motakhasesa) (stereo) – mainly old Egyptian songs.
106.3 MHz Voice of the Arabs (Sawt el Arab) (mono) – spoken content.
107.4 MHz Egyptian Radio - General Program (El-Bernameg El-'Aam) (mono) – spoken content
108 MHz on sport  aka as Goal FM (Al-Shabab Wal Riyadah Radio) (mono) – sports news, live matches and songs.

North coast
Foreign radio stations can be received in summer, mainly: Cypriot, Greek, Italian and Israeli radio stations, but reception is unreliable and fades quickly.

Alexandria 
As of 2007, there were 6 radio stations.

88 MHz Musical Program (stereo)
88.2 MHz Radio Hits (stereo) (since 2010)
88.7 FM Radio Orient (إذاعة الشرق) (The only fully foreign broadcast on the local FM)
90.1 MHz Koran Station (mono)
92.7 MHz Mega FM (stereo; RDS) (since 2010)
94.3 MHz European Program (stereo)
95.5 MHz Shaabi FM (stereo)
97.6 MHz Specialty Songs (stereo)
101.1 MHz Radio Alexandria (mono)
104.7 MHz General Program (mono)

There used to be local radio stations which were aired in the languages, Armenian, Italian, French, Greek and English in the 1940s.

Marina area 
Since 2009, the government sometimes occasionally broadcasts some radio stations which are only broadcast to Greater Cairo, on the same frequencies used in Greater Cairo. On occasions such as the official vacations in Egypt. The broadcasts can be received by nearby local touristic villages to Marina and very weakly in Alexandria, likewise the radio stations broadcast to Alexandria are received very weakly in and around Marina.

88.7 MHz Radio Masr (stereo; RDS) (since 2010)
90.9 MHz El Radio FM 90 9 (stereo; RDS) (since February 2012)
100.6 MHz Nogoum FM (stereo; RDS)
104.2 MHz Nile FM (stereo; RDS)
105.3 MHz Nagham FM (stereo) (since 2012)

Red Sea

El Gouna 

88.6 MHz Radio Misr
91.7 MHz El Quran El Karim
98.2 MHz El Aghany
100 MHz El Gouna Radio ("Lagoon Radio") (stereo) (Italian and English) (privately owned by Orascom)
101.7 MHz Al Shabab Wel Riada
105.3 MHz El Barnamag El Aam

Soma Bay 
 Robinson FM - at Robinson hotel

Sharm El Sheikh 

Most if not all of them are already broadcast in Greater Cairo, except South Sinai.

88 MHz ? (mono) – spoken content.
89.4 MHz General (mono)
91.1 MHz Musical (stereo)
92.5 MHz ? (mono) – spoken content.
94.3 MHz ?
95.7 MHz ? (mono) – spoken content.
97.6 MHz ?
99 MHz South Sinai (mono) – spoken content.

Dahab 
92 MHz Koran (mono)
98.5 MHz ? (mono) – spoken content.
103.7 MHz ? (mono) – spoken content.
107.3 MHz European Program (stereo)

Central Egypt 
89.8 MHz koran station covered Fayoum and Bani Sweif 
101.4 MHz northern upper station covered Bani Sweif and Fayoum
94.2 MHz northern upper station covered Minya

Internet stations 
After the slow adoption of broadband internet, in the mid-2000s, a number of internet stations streamed on the internet, and a few of them stream on a regular basis.

Examples 
 TIBA Radio (private; Adult Contemporary and Classic Hits; based in Hurghada)
Radio Horytna ("Our Freedom Radio"; private; popular songs, talk shows; based in Cairo; evolved into a podcast)
 Tram Radio (private; underground music; based in Alexandria; now off)
 Radio Banha (public; popular Egyptian songs; based in Banha)
 Hawak Radio since 2013 on Tunein; based in Cairo
 RADIO 5:14 internet Christian radio since 2016 on website radio514.blogspot.com based in Suez, Egypt

International stations 
As of the 1952 coup d'état, no foreign station is allowed to broadcast on Egyptian-controlled land with a 2018 exception in Alexandria (Radio Orient), therefore international broadcasters broadcast from lands close to Egypt, mostly close to the north of Egypt, from Cyprus. Many state controlled radio stations used to broadcast primarily on the medium wave using amplitude modulation broadcasting, but after the adoption of FM broadcasting in Egypt, most of them now are simulcasted on the medium wave and the FM band since the early 2000s. The state controlled radios aren't listed below.

AM radio broadcasting in Egypt had always been mono and other developments were never introduced. The long wave band had never been used.

Historical
International medium wave broadcasting was gradually replaced from 2019 by internet services, e.g online streaming or podcasts, or ceased entirely.

Medium wave
639 kHz BBC Arabic and BBC World Service (British radio service) – in Literary Arabic. (the broadcasting antenna is in Cape Greco, Cyprus) 
1233 kHz Monte Carlo International (French radio service) – in Literary Arabic. (the broadcasting antenna is at Cape Greco. It's very hard to receive the signal away from northernmost Egypt)
990 kHz (till 2019) Radio Sawa (American radio service) – news, informational content and popular songs; most spoken content in Literary Arabic. (since March 23, 2002; the broadcasting antenna is in Cape Greco. During the day, the farther from the north, the harder it is to receive the signal; at first it simulcasted on 981 and 1260 kHz, in 2005 it changed the first frequency to 990 kHz, then it abolished the second one in 2008)

Short wave
In the 1960s, at time of Nasser rule, short wave broadcasting was important for the state. It used to broadcast stations to the Middle East which were of propagandist importance to the Egyptian regime and for propagating for Arab nationalism.

See also 
 Media of Egypt
 List of newspapers in Egypt
 List of magazines in Egypt
 Television in Egypt
 Telecommunications in Egypt
 List of radio stations in Africa
 Radio in other continents
 Lists of radio stations in Asia
 Lists of radio stations in Europe
 Lists of radio stations in North America
 Lists of radio stations in South America
 Lists of radio stations in the South Pacific and Oceania

Notes and references

External links
 Account Suspended Egypt Radio Stations Live
 :::: ÇäÇÐÇÙÉ :::: for more information about the Egyptian Radio industry.
 FM Radio Online database of FM stations (select country "EGY" after logging in or continuing as guest) 
 FMSCAN reception prediction of FM, TV, MW, SW stations (also use the expert options for better results)

Egypt, FM
FM
radio